Wests Scarborough Rugby Union Football Club, often shortened to Wests Scarborough or just "Wests", is a rugby union club based in Doubleveiw, Scarborough, Perth, Western Australia. They have several teams competing in RugbyWA competitions and have one side playing in the RugbyWA Fortescue Premier Grade.

The club, established in 1930 and reformed in 1950, trains and plays at Bennett Park in Doubleveiw. The club has a newly renovated clubhouse, with a kitchen, licensed bar and changing facilities, overlooking the two rugby pitches.

History 
The club was formed in 1930 as the Western Suburbs Rugby Union Club, winning its first premiership in 1932. The club folded during World War II but was reformed in 1950. From 1970 to 1974 four consecutive premierships were captured by the club, during these years members of the club were selected to play for Australia. From the 1970s onwards Wests started their first juniors (schoolboy) teams to capture young talent. After the year 2000, the quality of play within the club greatly improved. Wests saw 5 teams make the finals in 2002 with the premier team winning the minor premiership. In 2003 first grade won both the minor and major premiership flags. Wests Scarborough became the dominant club in premier grade competition in the early to late 2000's. The club moved to Bennet Park in 2013 after a dispute with the Subiaco Soccer Club.

Honours 

 Premier Grade (12)
1932, 1971, 1974, 1975, 1976, 1977, 2003, 2004, 2005, 2006, 2016, 2017

Notable players 
 John Welborn - Western Suburbs, UWA, Western Australia, .

See also 
 RugbyWA
 City of Stirling
 Perth
 Rugby Union in Western Australia
 Rugby Union in Australia

References 

Rugby union teams in Western Australia
Rugby clubs established in 1930
1930 establishments in Australia